The Broterian Society is a botanical scientific society, the first of its kind in Portugal, established in 1880 by Júlio Henriques, professor of Botany and Agriculture at the University of Coimbra, to promote the development of botanical studies, particularly that of floristics, in Portugal. It is thus named after eminent naturalist Félix de Avelar Brotero, author of the first lengthy description of native Portuguese plants, Flora Lusitanica, in 1804.

It has continuously published the Boletim da Sociedade Broteriana (Bol. Soc. Brot.), a scientific journal, since its inception; the first volume was published in 1883.

References

1880 establishments in Portugal
Organisations based in Coimbra
Scientific organisations based in Portugal
Scientific organizations established in 1880